Uyugan, officially the Municipality of Uyugan, is a 6th class municipality in the province of Batanes, Philippines. According to the 2020 census, it has a population of 1,380 people.

History
Thousands of years before Spanish colonization, about a thousand people lived on fortified cliffs and hilltops scattered across today's Uyugan. The fortified settlements were called "Idiang" and derived from the Ivatan word "Idi" or "Idian" which means home or hometown. They belonged to the Ivatan tribes and spoke the same Ivatan language, but with a southern accent.

The Ivatan tribes who called the place home farmed, where soil permitted, and they fished. They were also a boat-making and seafaring people, and they traded with neighbouring Taiwan to the North and Cagayan to the South.

The Ivatan tribal settlements had a de facto tribal government, not very much different from that of tribal governments in the earlier stages of human evolution. The tribal settlement was headed by a chieftain with a deputy.

Inter-tribal hostilities (Arap du Tukon) or War on the Hill were common in those days but for men only. Common law prohibited the harming of womenfolk who were the main providers of food in wartime.

In the late 1600s, Dominican missionaries landed in Batanes. The native people were in the beginning not all that welcoming to the early Spanish colonizers, but slowly they were able to adopt themselves to the Spanish ways. The Spaniards had very different lifestyles, beliefs, and traditions than the Ivatan tribes. They didn't understand the native peoples' social customs, generous nature, religious beliefs, or love of the land.

According to church records, the first mass and baptism in the islands was celebrated in what is now Imnajbu in Uyugan.

The Spanish missionaries, finding the conditions harsh in Batanes, there were attempts to resettle the Ivatans in Cagayan, but they always found their way home - they sailed back to Batanes.

In 1782, Spanish Governor-General Jose Basco y Vargas sent an expedition to formally get the consent of the Ivatans to become subjects of the King of Spain.

On June 26, 1783, de facto Ivatan independence was lost - a sad day to many Ivatans, but equally, a new beginning and a day of celebration to many other Ivatans. On that day (called Batanes Day today) the Spanish representatives of the King of Spain met the representatives of the chiefs and nobles of Batanes on the Plains of Vasay (in what is now Basco town) for the ceremonial formal annexation of Batanes to the Spanish Empire.

The new province was named Provincia de la Conception. Governor-General Jose Basco y Vargas was named "Conde de la Conquista de Batanes" and the capital town of Basco was named after him. The Dominican Order established missions, among them the San Jose de Ivana mission which included all of present-day Uyugan and Sabtang.

The Americans followed the Spaniards to Batanes after the Spanish naval defeat at Manila Bay. The  dropped anchor at Basco Bay in February 1900. In 1901, the province was reclassified to a township, but provincial status was restored in 1909, and with it the creation of Uyugan as a separate township (municipality).

American public school system was introduced and general health and sanitation campaign was launched. In the 1930s, the Americans built a better road system that replaced the road system (El Camino Real) built during the Spanish period.

Geography
Uyugan is located at 

According to the Philippine Statistics Authority, the municipality has a land area of  constituting  of the  total area of Batanes.

It is located along the banks of what was once a brook, a kilometer east of the Ivana-Uyugan border.

There are two other major settlements in the municipality situated along the Pacific seaboard: Itbud and Imnajbu.

The land is varied. It changes from rocky hills along the coasts to grassy and forest hills in the interior. Most of the land has been cleared for farming.

In the language of the Ivatans, Uyugan means place of flowing water—which is never far away except in the town proper itself: Today's brook bed that cuts the town proper in half dried up during the severe earth movements of 1918.

Barangays
Uyugan is politically subdivided into four barangays. These barangays are headed by elected officials: Barangay Captain, Barangay Council, whose members are called Barangay Councilors. All are elected every three years.

Climate

Uyugan's climate ranges from humid oceanic to sub-tropic. The Philippine Sea/Pacific Ocean to the east moderate the climate—cooling summers. It is coldest in January and warmest in May.

January temperatures average .

Precipitation is heaviest during the non-summer months brought in by the typhoons that frequent the area. Uyugan's annual rainfall varies, but is highest in the north and lowest in the south. The heaviest rainfalls happen in a belt lying inland from Mount Chakarangan in north-western Uyugan (Songet) to Mount Vatohayao in north-eastern Uyugan (Imnajbu).

The weather is foggy at the onset of the colder months, caused by the cold polar air from the north (Continental Asia/Siberia) meeting warm moist air from the south.

Demographics

In the 2020 census, Uyugan had a population of 1,380.

Uyugan's population has not changed much since its founding as a separate township (municipality) on May 20, 1909. Its population is around a tenth of the population of Batanes.

Half of Uyugan's population lives in the town proper or Uyugan Centro that comprises the barangays of Kayuganan and Kayvaluganan. The other half live in Itbud and Imnajbu.

The four Uyugan barangays or municipal districts along the coasts and brooks. They grew up there because of the sea and fresh waters necessary for their livelihood. All of the barangays have a main street as the core of their socio-economic life.

Most of the people speak Ivatan as their first language, and most speak Ilocano, Tagalog, and English as their second languages.

Economy 

The Uyugan economy is mainly agriculture and fishing.

Farming in Uyugan began long before the arrival of the Spaniards. The Ivatans loved the land and cultivated many plants for food.

Isantonino farmers started with root crops, but when the Spaniards arrived, they learned to grow other crops, while introducing livestock and vegetables. Farming meant growing root crops—often just enough to feed the farmer's family.

Camoté and other root crops became Uyugan's most hardy and widely grown crops, but in the 1950s, livestock became more important than root crops on Uyugan farms. The government brought breeding bulls and the farmers moved to "mixed" farming on a small scale.

Uyugan's farms are not scientific, but government agricultural extension workers give direction and support to farming methods. The farmers seldom have problems like plant and animal diseases and pests.

Today's Isantonino farmer still could barely feed his family due to antiquated methods of farming dictated mainly by the topography of the land that at best is unsuitable to agriculture. Nevertheless, Uyugan was a leading producer of beef cattle and garlic prior to the global economy.

Fishing plays a role in partly meeting the fish requirements of the municipality. Fishing methods use hook and line and cast nets.

Situated north of Imnajbu is Madi Bay in Mahatao, one of the richest fishing grounds in all of mainland Batanes, where Isantoninos (Uyugan) along with Isancarnos (Mahatao) and other Ivatans (Ivasays) engaged in coastal fishing.

Government
Uyugan, belonging to the lone congressional district of the province of Batanes, is governed by a mayor designated as its local chief executive and by a municipal council as its legislative body in accordance with the Local Government Code. The mayor, vice mayor, and the councilors are elected directly by the people through an election which is being held every three years.

Elected officials

Education
The Schools Division of Batanes governs the town's public education system. The division office is a field office of the DepEd in Cagayan Valley region. The office governs the public and private elementary and public and private high schools throughout the municipality.

References

External links

 [ Philippine Standard Geographic Code]

Municipalities of Batanes